In 4-dimensional geometry, the dodecahedral pyramid is bounded by one dodecahedron on the base and 12 pentagonal pyramid cells which meet at the apex. Since a dodecahedron's circumradius is greater than its edge length, the pentagonal pyramids require tall isosceles triangle faces.

The dual to the dodecahedral pyramid is an icosahedral pyramid, seen as an icosahedral base, and 20 regular tetrahedra meeting at an apex.

References

External links

 Richard Klitzing, Axial-Symmetrical Edge Facetings of Uniform Polyhedra

4-polytopes